Chunsky (masculine), Chunskaya (feminine), or Chunskoye (neuter) may refer to:
Chunsky District, a district of Irkutsk Oblast, Russia
Chunsky (urban-type settlement), an urban-type settlement in Irkutsk Oblast, Russia